The TurboDuo is a fourth-generation video game console developed by NEC Home Electronics and Hudson Soft for the North American market. The TurboDuo was test-marketed in Los Angeles in October 1992, before a nationwide rollout in May 1993. It is the North American version of the Japanese PC Engine Duo game console which was released in September 1991.

In the United States, the TurboDuo was marketed by Turbo Technologies, Inc. (or TTI) of Los Angeles, a joint venture of NEC Home Electronics and Hudson Soft. It was established to market NEC consoles in North America after NEC Home Electronics USA failed to effectively market the platform.

The TurboDuo integrates the capabilities of the TurboGrafx-16 and its CD-ROM drive (the TurboGrafx-CD) into a single, redesigned unit with an updated BIOS and 192 KB of additional RAM. TTI also offered the Super System Card via mail order, which provided the original TurboGrafx-CD with the 192 KB RAM upgrade.

The RAM increase and BIOS update afford the TurboDuo and PC Engine Duo compatibility with all CD-ROM² and Super CD-ROM² titles (Japanese and North American). Like the TurboGrafx-CD, the TurboDuo can read Compact Disc Digital Audio and CD+G discs. The TurboDuo, however, cannot read PC Engine HuCards without modification or an adapter. With a HuCard adapter and an Arcade Card Duo, the TurboDuo can also read Arcade CD-ROM² games (which were sold only in Japan).

Marketing

Japan
When the PC Engine Duo launched in Japan on September 21, 1991, it retailed for ¥59,800. The product garnered a Good Design Award.

NEC later revised the design of the console to reduce both manufacturing costs and the sale price. The Duo R omits the 3.5 mm phone connector for headphones, and the locking switch for the lid of the Duo's top-loading CD-ROM drive. The Duo R has an differently shaped, off-white casing.

NEC released its final variation of the PC Engine Duo on June 25, 1994. The  has a bluer case, and was bundled with the Arcade Pad 6, a six-button controller, instead of the standard Turbo Pad controller.

North America
TTI released the TurboDuo to consumers in North America in October 1992, at a retail price of US$299.99. The price was, in part, a consequence of the relatively high cost of CD-ROM drive manufacturing.

Since TTI understood that the price was too high for many people in their target market, they included a booklet of coupons for TurboDuo games and accessories, plus several pack-in games on two CD-ROMs: Ys Book I & II (1990) and a Super CD compilation of four of Hudson Soft's more popular TurboGrafx-16 titles: Bonk's Adventure (1989), Bonk's Revenge (1991), Gate of Thunder (1992), and Bomberman (1983). (Bomberman was hidden in an Easter egg.) The package also included one TurboChip game: Dungeon Explorer (Hudson Soft 1989). Later, TTI replaced Dungeon Explorer with one of a variety of TurboChip titles, such as Ninja Spirit (Irem 1988) and Final Lap Twin (Namco 1989).

With the release of the TurboDuo, TTI reduced the retail price of the TurboGrafx-CD peripheral for the TurboGrafx-16 to $150.00, and began marketing the Super System Card, which enabled the TurboGrafx-CD to play the new Super CD games. The Super System Card is programmed with the updated v3.0 BIOS, and increases the TurboGrafx-16's RAM by 192 kilobytes. The TurboGrafx-CD requires the updated BIOS to read Super CD discs, and the additional RAM to run the software capably. The Super System Card retailed for US$65 or, when bundled with the TurboDuo's Super CD compilation disc, US$95.

For the TurboDuo marketing campaign, TTI used a character called "Johnny Turbo". In 1998, Jonathan J. Burtenshaw of GameSpy described the advertising campaign as "petty" and "overly confrontational," and conjectured that the campaign hurt TurboDuo sales.

Technical specification

 CPU
 The Hudson Soft HuC6280 is a modified 65C02 with an effective clock rate of 1.79 or 7.16 MHz (switchable by software). The integrated components of this 8-bit processor include a timer, general-purpose I/O port, and bankswitching hardware (which drives a 21-bit external address bus from a 6502-compatible 16-bit address bus). It is capable of block transfer instructions, as well as dedicated move instructions for communicating with the TurboDuo's video display controller, the HuC6270A.

 Video processing
 One 16-bit HuC6260 video color encoder (VCE)
 One 16-bit HuC6270A video display controller (VDC). Like the TMS99xx family of video display processors, it has port-based I/O.

 Display resolution
 Horizontal lines: Maximum of 512, programmable in 8-pixel increments
 Vertical lines: Maximum of 240, programmable in 8-pixel increments

 Color
 Color depth: 9-bit
 512-color palette (maximum of 481 colors on-screen: 241 for background tiles, 240 for sprites)
 Up to 32 palettes (16 for background tiles, 16 for sprites)
 Up to 16 colors per palette (15 colors + transparency)

 Sprites
 Sizes: 16×16, 16×32, 32×16, 32×32, 32×64
 Simultaneously displayable: 64 (maximum of 8–16 per line, depending on sprite width)
 Each sprite can use up to 15 unique colors (one color must be reserved as transparent) via one of the 16 available sprite palettes.
 The HuC6270A VDC can display one sprite layer. Sprites could be placed either in front of or behind background tiles.

 Tiles
 Each 8×8-pixel background tile can use up to 16 unique colors via one of the 16 available background palettes. The first color entry of each background palette must be the same across all background palettes. The HuC6270A VDC can display one background layer.

Memory
 Work RAM: 8 KB
 Video RAM: 64 KB
 Additional 192 KB of built in Memory (System 3.0)

 Sound
 Six wavetable synthesis audio channels, programmable through the CPU
 One ADPCM channel
 Compact Disc Digital Audio

 Software media
 TurboChip (called HuCard in Japan), a thin, card-like ROM cartridge. Published games consumed up to 20 Mb (2.5 MB).
 CD-ROM² (pronounced "CD-ROM-ROM" in Japan), a proprietary CD-ROM-based media. Unlike the TurboGrafx-CD add-on, the TurboDuo could play standard CD-ROM² discs, as well Super CD-ROM² discs, without the need of a System Card. Early CD-ROM² games released in North America were branded as TurboGrafx-CD discs, but this relabeling fell into disuse after the launch of the TurboDuo in favor of keeping the CD-ROM² and Super CD-ROM² labeling used in Japan.

See also
 List of PC Engine emulators
 List of TurboGrafx-16 games/PC Engine games

References

External links

 PC-Engine technical documentation for programmers at MagicEngine.com
 Frozen Utopia, a website for PC-Engine game developers

Computer-related introductions in 1992
CD-ROM-based consoles
Fourth-generation video game consoles
NEC consoles
Home video game consoles
TurboGrafx-16
65xx-based video game consoles